Ted Hubbard nicknamed "Hurricane Hubbard" (born in Lydden, England) was a former motorcycle speedway rider in National League (speedway) and British League

Career
A longer career than many speedway riders, Ted Hubbard was a popular sportsman who rode chiefly for Canterbury Crusaders and Rye House Rockets with loans out to other clubs, most notably Hackney Hawks
 
He made two appearances at the Division II Riders Championship, finishing in the top three both times and was successful at several individual meetings of riders in Division II. He left Rye House in 1979 as doubling up rides with Hackney was too demanding, seeing as he was also involved in the family business. Tempted back to racing by Canterbury Crusaders in 1980 he once again thought of full retirement at the end of the season but his old promoter, Len Silver persuaded him to ride for Hackney for one more season. However, the conflict with his business and the risk of injury that might damage his livelihood brought him to finally hang up his leathers at the age of 32. He had a brief spell as Team Manager of the Iwade based Sittingbourne Crusaders.

After Speedway
The family business in Fruit and Veg expanded to include wholesale potato supplies to fish-and-chip shops in Kent.
Married to Jeannette, they had three children, Jason, Stuart, Nicola, and four grandchildren.
They took on a 47 acre farm as a business-cum-hobby. He died of liver cancer, aged 70, in 2019

References

External links
 https://wwosbackup.proboards.com/thread/1373
 http://kent-speedway.com/news.php?extend.1497 (obit)
 https://www.kentonline.co.uk/canterbury/sport/travelling-down-speedways-memor-a22673/
 https://www.youtube.com/watch?v=EFGfesFl10o (Les Rumsey on Ted Hubbard)
 https://www.retro-speedway.com/backtrack-backissues-92-101 (Issue 95: TED HUBBARD: Exclusive interview. Former Canterbury and Rye House star Ted Hubbard, who passed away recently, gave this last, candid in-depth interview to TONY McDONALD. 'Hurricane' also talks about his two spells with Hackney at opposite ends of his successful career, plus the tragic loss of his good friend Graham Banks.)

1949 births
2019 deaths
English motorcycle racers
British speedway riders
Rye House Rockets riders
Canterbury Crusaders riders